Pandemonium – The Singles Collection is a greatest hits record by Swedish band BWO. It contains the hits from their three studio albums, and three new songs:

 Lay Your Love on Me, the band's 2008 entry in the Swedish pre-selection for Eurovision, Melodifestivalen
 Barcelona
 The Bells of Freedom, used as the theme song of the 2008 Europride; its video features Alexander's former band, Army of Lovers

A DVD of the same name, containing all 16 video clips and 2 remix videos, was released in Sweden on October 8, 2008.

Track listing
The Bells of Freedom (3:25)
Lay Your Love on Me (2:59)
Barcelona (3:45)
Sunshine in the Rain (3:30)
Give Me the Night (3:09)
Chariots of Fire (4:09)
Open Door (3:29)
Gomenasai (3:27)
Sixteen Tons of Hardware (3:30)
Will My Arms Be Strong Enough (4:16)
We Should Be Dancing (3:34)
Temple of Love (3:25)
Living in a Fantasy (3:39)
We Could Be Heroes (4:24)
Voodoo Magic (3:41)
Let It Rain (3:30)
Conquering America (3:20)
The Destiny of Love (3:50)

References

BWO (band) albums
2008 compilation albums
2008 video albums
Music video compilation albums
EMI Music Sweden albums